Di Matteo may refer to:

As a last name: 
Alessia di Matteo, the first person in history to survive the transplantation of eight organs in a single operation
Luca Di Matteo, an Italian football midfielder
Roberto Di Matteo, a former Italian professional footballer, and former manager of Chelsea F.C. and FC Schalke 04
Santino Di Matteo, a member of the Mafia from the town of Altofonte
As a middle name:
Bernardo di Matteo Gamberelli, an Italian sculptor
Filippo di Matteo Torelli,  an Italian painter
Michele di Matteo Lambertini, an Italian painter

As a first name:
Matteo di Andrea de' Pasti, an Italian sculptor
Matteo di Guaro Allio, an Italian sculptor

As a business name:
DiMatteo Vineyards, a winery in New Jersey

Italian-language surnames
Patronymic surnames
Surnames from given names